The International Basketball Federation (FIBA  ;) is an association of national organizations which governs the sport of basketball worldwide.

FIBA defines the rules of basketball, specifies the equipment and facilities required, organises international competitions, regulates the transfer of athletes across countries, and controls the appointment of international referees. A total of 212 national federations are now members, organized since 1989 into five zones: Africa, Americas, Asia, Europe, and Oceania.

FIBA organizes both the men's and women's FIBA World Olympic Qualifying Tournament and the Summer Olympics Basketball Tournament, which are sanctioned by the IOC. The FIBA Basketball World Cup is a world tournament for men's national teams held every four years. Teams compete for the Naismith Trophy, named in honor of basketball's American-Canadian creator James Naismith. The tournament structure is similar but not identical to that of the FIFA World Cup in association football; these tournaments occurred in the same year from 1970 through 2014, but starting in 2019, the Basketball World Cup will move to the year following the FIFA World Cup. A parallel event for women's teams, the FIBA Women's Basketball World Cup, is also held quadrennially; from 1986 through 2014, it was held in the same year as the men's event but in a different country.

History

1932–49; founding and early years

The association was founded in Geneva in 1932, two years after the sport was officially recognized by the IOC. Before 1934 basketball was under the umbrella of the International Amateur Handball Federation. The eight nation's basketball federations that were the founding members of FIBA were: Argentina's Basketball Federation, Czechoslovakia's Basketball Federation, Greece's Basketball Federation, Italy's Basketball Federation, Latvia's Basketball Federation, Portugal's Basketball Federation, Romania's Basketball Federation, and Switzerland's Basketball Federation. During the 1936 Summer Olympics held in Berlin, the Federation named James Naismith (1861–1939), the founder of basketball, as its Honorary President.

1950–2019; development

FIBA has organized a World Championship, now known as World Cup, for men since 1950 and a Women's World Championship, now known as the Women's World Cup, since 1953. From 1986 through 2014, both events were held every four years, alternating with the Olympics. As noted above, the men's World Cup was moved to a new four-year cycle, with tournaments in the year before the Summer Olympics, after 2014.

The Federation headquarters moved to Munich in 1956, then returned to Geneva in 2002. In 1991, it founded the FIBA Hall of Fame; the first induction ceremony was held on 12 September 2007, during EuroBasket 2007. During its 81st anniversary in 2013, FIBA moved into its new headquarters, "The House of Basketball", at Mies. Andreas Zagklis became the  Secretary-General of FIBA on 7 December 2018.

2020–present; suspensions of Russia and Belarus
In February 2022, Russia and Belarus were suspended from international competitions until further notice due to Russia's invasion of Ukraine. It also banned the two countries from hosting any competitions.

Presidents

During the 1936 Summer Olympics the FIBA honored James A. Naismith, the founder of basketball, as their honorary President.

Secretaries General

Tournaments

World champions

World club champions

Continental champions

Continental club champions

3x3 world champions

Awards

Most Valuable Player

FIBA World Rankings

Men's

The following table has the Top 32 men's basketball countries in the world. The Top 32 is here due to the next iteration of the FIBA Basketball World Cup, the world's major tournament in men's basketball, anticipating to have 32 countries compete. As such, this table shows the projected teams in the next FIBA Men's WC based on the ranking's algorithm. This list does not consider berths given to countries based on hosting or region status.

Women's

The following table has the Top 16 women's basketball countries in the world. The Top 16 is here due to the next iteration of the FIBA Women's Basketball World Cup, the world's major tournament in women's basketball, anticipating to have 16 countries compete. As such, this table shows the projected teams in the next FIBA Women's WC based on the ranking's algorithm. This list does not consider berths given to countries based on hosting or region status.

References

External links 

 
 InterBasket – International Basketball News, Blog and Forum, covering FIBA, Euroleague, NBA
 
 International Basketball News

 
Sports organizations established in 1932
 
International sports bodies based in Switzerland
International sports organizations
1932 establishments in Switzerland